Barton Hollow  is the first full-length studio album from the Civil Wars. Produced by Charlie Peacock, it was released on February 1, 2011. It peaked at No. 1 on the Billboard Digital Albums chart, No. 10 on the Billboard 200, No. 1 on the Billboard Folk Albums chart, and No. 2 on the Billboard Rock Albums chart, selling 25,000 copies in its first week.  , the album has sold 623,000 copies in the US.

Barton Hollow was preceded by the lead single and title track, which was performed live on The Tonight Show with Jay Leno on January 14, 2011.  A track on this album, "Poison and Wine" was previously released as a single from their EP Poison & Wine in 2009. On November 30, 2011, Barton Hollow was nominated for Grammys in the Best Folk Album and Best Country Duo/Group Performance categories, the latter for the title song. The album ended up winning both awards. Numerous publications noted that the Civil Wars were snubbed a Best New Artist nomination by The Grammys. At the ceremony the Civil Wars performed a portion of "Barton Hollow". The vinyl LP version of the record was pressed at United Record Pressing in Nashville, TN.

Critical reception

Barton Hollow was included on the 2011 Best Album lists of NPR Music, Paste Magazine, American Songwriter, Rough Trade, Amazon.com, Time, iTunes, The Huffington Post, Associated Press, The Tennessean, AllMusic.com and more.

Andrew Leahey of AllMusic said that Williams and White "trace each other's melodies with close harmonies that never fail to lose their romance". He gave Barton Hollow four of five star and called it "Good stuff". Darren Lee of MusicOMH also gave four of five stars, saying "The album's songs of love, loss and longing are an immediate pleasure to listen to, displaying real restraint in a disc that it is pleasingly sparse and unembellished."

In 2017 it was ranked No. 66 in Paste magazine's "The 100 Best Indie Folk Albums" list.

Track listing
All songs written by Joy Williams and John Paul White, except where noted. The two bonus tracks are available with electronic versions of the album, but not on the CD. An extended version of Barton Hollow was released in Europe through Sony Music on March 1, 2012, which contained the 12 tracks included with the North American release, the 2 bonus tracks from the electronic version, plus 4 additional tracks.

Personnel
Listed in AllMusic.

 Joy Williams: lead vocals, background vocals, piano, Hohner organ, bells
 John Paul White: lead vocals, background vocals, acoustic guitar, electric guitar, resonator guitar, banjo, bass guitar
 Andy Leftwich: fiddle, mandolin
 David Davidson: violin
 John Catchings: cello
 Jerry McPherson: electric guitar
 J.T. Corenflos: electric guitar
 Dan Dugmore: pedal steel guitar
 Tim Lauer: keyboards, synthesizer, keyboard bass, organ, "tiny keyboard"
 Charlie Peacock: electric piano, trumpet, producer, additional engineering
 Barry Bales: double bass
 Ken Lewis: percussion
 Richie Biggs: engineer, mixer
 Richard Dodd: mastering

Charts

Weekly charts

Year-end charts

Singles

 Did not enter the Hot 100 but charted on Bubbling Under Hot 100 Singles.

Certifications

References

2011 albums
The Civil Wars albums
Albums produced by Charlie Peacock